The Constitutional Court is the constitutional court for the Republic of Suriname. Its establishment was already foreseen in both the constitution of Suriname of 1975 and the current constitution of 1987, but it took until 4 October 2019 for the National Assembly to enact a law providing for the establishment of a constitutional court. After some errors concerning the official proclamation of the establishment of the court were corrected, the members of the court were installed on 7 May 2020.

The lack of a constitutional court became an imminent problem after the court-martial decided in 2015 that the 2012 amnesty law that should have halted the prosecution of the December murders must be tested in the constitutional court first.

Composition 
The composition of the court is as follows:

President
Gloria Karg-Stirling 

Vice President
Kenneth Amoksi 

Members
Anoeradha Akkal-Ramautar
Rinette Djokarto 
Maya Fokké-Manohar 

Substitute members
Bien Sojo
Jornell Vinkwolk 
Roy Chitanie

See also
Constitutional Court of Sint Maarten

References 

Courts in Suriname
Suriname
Suriname
Paramaribo